Adnan Menderes University (In Turkish: Adnan Menderes Üniversitesi) was founded in Aydın, Turkey in 1992. The name of the university comes from the former Turkish Prime Minister Adnan Menderes.

Units

Faculties
Tourism Faculty
Medical School
Faculty of Education
Faculty of Arts and Sciences
Nazilli Faculty of Economics and Administrative Sciences
Faculty of veterinary medicine
Faculty of Agriculture
Communication faculty
Engineering faculty
Aydın Faculty of Economics
Faculty of Dentistry
Söke Business Administration Faculty
Soke Architecture Faculty
Kuşadası Maritime Faculty
Faculty of Nursing
Faculty of Health Sciences

Institutes
Institute of Science and Technology
Health Sciences Institute
Institute of Social Sciences

Colleges
High school of Physical Education and Sports
Nazilli School of Applied Science
Söke Health School
Söke Health School
School of Foreign Languages
Nazilli State Conservatory

Vocational Schools
Atça Vocational School
Aydın Vocational School
Aydin Health Services Vocational School
Bozdoğan Vocational School
Çine Vocational School
Didim Vocational School
Karacasu Vocational School
Kuyucak Vocational School
Cooperative Vocational School
Nazilli Vocational School
Nazilli Health Services Vocational School
Söke Vocational School
Söke Health Services Vocational School
Sultanhisar Vocational School
Yenipazar Vocational School
Buharkent Vocational School

See also
 Adnan Menderes
 Adnan Menderes Airport

References

External links
 Adnan Menderes University - Official website

Universities and colleges in Turkey
Education in Aydın
Educational institutions established in 1992
Adnan Menderes
State universities and colleges in Turkey
Buildings and structures in Aydın Province
1992 establishments in Turkey